Bullgill is a hamlet in Cumbria, England.

Geography
The River Ellen flows nearby.

History
Bullgill was developed as a mining community. The Ellen Pit coal mine was sunk in 1859.

It closed to passengers on 7 March 1960.

Governance
Bullgill, is part of the Workington constituency of the UK parliament. The current Member of Parliament is Sue Hayman, a member of the Labour Party. The Labour Party has won the seat in every general election since 1979; the Conservative Party has only been elected once in Workington since the Second World War: in the  1976 Workington by-election.

For the European Parliament residents in Allonby voted to elect MEP's for the North West England constituency.

For Local Government purposes it is in the Ellen & Gilcrux Ward of Allerdale Borough Council and the Maryport North Ward of Cumbria County Council.

The village also has its own Parish Council; Crosscanonby Parish Council.

A Poem about Bullgill
This poem, attributed to Gordon Nicholl, describes the closure of Bulgill Colliery in about 1910. 
 
Original West-Cumbrian Version:

Translation:

See also
List of places in Cumbria

References

Hamlets in Cumbria
Crosscanonby